Kingston-upon-Thames (spelt with hyphens) was a local government district in north east Surrey, England from 1835 to 1965 around the town now known as Kingston upon Thames. It was alternatively known as Kingston on Thames (spelt with or without hyphens). It was a municipal borough and also held the rarer status of Royal borough. The district was abolished in 1965 and was replaced with the larger London Borough of Kingston upon Thames in Greater London, with the Royal borough status passed to the new district.

History

The ancient borough of Kingston-upon-Thames received its charter in 1484 from Edward IV. The borough corporation was reformed by the Municipal Corporations Act 1835. The ancient parish of Kingston-upon-Thames was much larger than the ancient borough. Through the gradual process of splitting off new parishes, the borough and parish became coterminous in 1894.

It formed part of the expanded Metropolitan Police District from 1840 and the London Traffic Area from 1924.

It was known as a Royal borough through ancient custom and the right to the title was confirmed by George V in 1927. The borough formed part of the London Passenger Transport Area from 1933.

The district was abolished in 1965 by the London Government Act 1963 and its former area was transferred to Greater London to be combined with that of the Municipal Borough of Malden and Coombe and the Municipal Borough of Surbiton to form the London Borough of Kingston upon Thames; with the status of Royal borough transferred to the new borough.

The borough's coat of arms was first registered in 1572. It was Azure three salmon naiant in pale argent. This coat of arms was re-adopted as that of the new London Borough of Kingston upon Thames in 1965, with the addition of a crest and supporters, and the changing of the colour of the fins of the three fishes from silver to red.

References

Kingston
History of the Royal Borough of Kingston upon Thames
Municipal boroughs of England
Places with royal patronage in England